Bernadeth is an extraterrestrial supervillainess appearing in comic books published by DC Comics.

Publication history
She first appeared in Mister Miracle #6 (February 1972) and was created by Jack Kirby.

Fictional character biography
Co-leader of the Female Furies, Bernadeth wields a "fahren-knife" that burns her victims from the inside. As the sister of Darkseid's servant, Desaad, Bernadeth is both notorious and feared by the masses of Apokolips. She was one of the first Furies to be recruited, though Bernadeth hated being led by others. When Big Barda left for Earth to be with Mister Miracle, Bernadeth joined her alongside Lashina, Stompa, and Mad Harriet for a brief period of time.

Later, Bernadeth returned to Apokolips with the other Furies sans Barda. Bernadeth saw Barda's permanent defecting as a way to gain leadership herself. However, Darkseid rewarded Lashina with leadership of the Furies. During a mission to retrieve Glorious Godfrey, Bernadeth betrayed Lashina and left her on Earth. Because of this, Bernadeth was temporarily able to achieve leadership over the Furies. When Lashina returned to Apokolips with the Suicide Squad, she snapped Bernadeth's neck after a long and fierce battle. Darkseid was appalled by the fact that Lashina brought outsiders to Apokolips, so he killed her and resurrected Bernadeth, although he later brought Lashina back to life as well.  Afterwards, Bernadeth agreed to share leadership duties.

Later on Apokolips, she was seen along with the rest of the Furies testing Granny Goodness' newest recruit Precious. After Supergirl's capture, Bernadeth and her teammates were defeated by Wonder Woman and Big Barda.

She appeared in both the  Seven Soldiers: Mister Miracle mini-series, and in Hawkgirl.

During Countdown to Final Crisis, Bernadeth attempted and failed to stop Jimmy Olsen and Forager from escaping Apokolips. After they escaped, Bernadeth was confronted by the Infinity-Man, presumably resulting in her death.

Bernadeth later appeared in as part of the "Dark Side Club". She created drugs that helped Granny Goodness brainwash superheroes into fighting at the Dark Side Club arena. She also experimented on cell samples from the club's victims, and thereby was the first to learn that Black Alice was related to Misfit.

The New 52
In The New 52, Darkseid is enslaved by his daughter Grail, leading Bernadeth and the other Female Furies to accept an offer from Big Barda to help defeat Grail as well as to protect Barda's husband, Mister Miracle. Bernadeth participated in the final battle against Grail and Darkseid, which resulted in the pair's defeat. Bernadeth then left for Apokolips with the rest of the Furies, including Barda.

DC Rebirth
Although Bernadeth was not seen with the other Female Furies who sided with Granny Goodness during Lex Luthor's reign as lord of Apokolips, she reunited with her teammates as they discovered Darkseid was alive on Earth. Along with the other Furies, Bernadeth was assigned to seek out mystical artifacts that would empower Darkseid. However, Bernadeth and the Furies were unable to gather the artifacts after being ambushed by Steve Trevor and his Oddfellows and returned to Darkseid. Despite threatening them, Darkseid allowed the Furies to live as he decided he had further use for them. Bernadeth later joined in the battle against Wonder Woman and A.R.G.U.S. in the Amazon Jungle, though it resulted in Darkseid's destruction.

At some point, Bernadeth attended the birth of Big Barda and Mister Miracle's son alongside the other Furies. She let Mister Miracle borrow her Fahren-Knife to "cut her as she needs to be cut". Big Barda assumed this to be a threat, but when the child was born, it left Barda's womb strangled by her invulnerable umbilical cord. With no other options, Mister Miracle used the Fahren-Knife to cut her cord and save the baby's life. Afterwards, Mister Miracle returned the weapon to Bernadeth, thanking her. She replied that she was glad it helped, but that she would use it to kill him when they returned to war. Later, she joined Kalibak and Kanto in a meeting with Mister Miracle, Big Barda, and Lightray to discuss the options of a peace treaty between Apokolips and New Genesis.

Granny Goodness soon took an interest in Harley Quinn, sending Bernadeth and Lashina to recruit the former criminal. While Lashina distracted Quinn, Bernadeth pricked her in the back with a knockout poison. The two then took Quinn to Apokolips where she officially became a Fury. After Quinn failed as a Fury, Bernadeth trapped her and a former Fury named Petite Tina inside her Personality Re-Education Center where she planned to wipe their minds. After many attempts, Bernadeth's machine was unable to do any permanent brain damage to Quinn. Frustrated, Bernadeth left the pair to find DeSaad's razor-edged Sanity Blade.

Powers and abilities
Bernadeth is extremely long-lived and possesses the standard superhuman strength, durability, and speed of all New Gods. She can lift several tons easily and her advanced physiology gives her superhuman endurance at all physical activities.
Bernadeth is very skilled in the hand-to-hand combat. Bernadeth's weapon of choice is the Fahren-Knife, a mystical dagger forged from Darkseid's skin that enables her to burn her victims from the inside out. Bernadeth's brother DeSaad gave her the knife as a present, and it is said to be powerful enough to kill gods.

Other versions

Amalgam
In the Marvel/DC amalgam series Unlimited Access, Bernadeth does not merge with any other villains, but is seen battling the heroes alongside Mad Harriet.

Sensation Comics Featuring Wonder Woman
Bernadeth appears in the story "Dig For Fire" in the anthology series Sensation Comics Featuring Wonder Woman. After discovering that Wonder Woman had traveled to Apokolips to save two of her Amazon sisters, Lashina, Stompa and Mad Harriet tracked her down. The trio refused to speak peacefully to Wonder Woman, and in the ensuing battle, the heroine was shot in the neck by an explosive dart from Bernadeth and thrown into the fiery pits by Stompa. When the Furies reported back to Darkseid, he was displeased that they had killed her rather than executing her publicly. Wonder Woman, still alive, managed to save her sisters. The Furies once again battled Wonder Woman, though the battle ended when Darkseid killed the two Amazons and allowed Wonder Woman to return to Earth.

In other media

Television
 Bernadeth appears in the Justice League Unlimited episode "Alive!", voiced by Jennifer Hale. She and the other Furies battled on Granny Goodness' side against the armies led by Virman Vunderbarr and Kanto. Before the battle can commence, Darkseid returns and ends the war.
 Bernadeth appears in the Justice League Action episode "It'll Take a Miracle!". She accompanies Granny Goodness and Lashina into competing with Batman to retrieve the Anti-Life Equation from Mister Miracle after Darkseid threatens Big Barda's life.

Film
 An alternate version of Bernadeth briefly appears in Justice League: Gods and Monsters. This version closely resembles her appearance from Justice League Unlimited.

Video games
 Bernadeth appears as a summonable character in Scribblenauts Unmasked: A DC Comics Adventure.

References

New Gods of Apokolips
Comics characters introduced in 1972
DC Comics aliens
DC Comics characters with superhuman strength
DC Comics deities
DC Comics demons
DC Comics extraterrestrial supervillains
DC Comics female supervillains
Fictional goddesses
Fictional knife-fighters
Characters created by Jack Kirby